Mail is a system for physically transporting postcards, letters, and parcels.

Mail or The Mail may also refer to:

Newspapers
 Daily Mail, a British newspaper 
The Mail on Sunday
MailOnline
 Sunday Mail (Adelaide), formerly The Mail, an Australian newspaper
 The Mail (Madras), formerly The Madras Mail
 The Mail (Cumbria), a British local newspaper 
 The Mail (Zimbabwe), a newspaper

Electronic mail and online services
 mail (Unix), a command line email client
 Mail (Windows), an e-mail client
 Apple Mail, an email client
 Email, electronic mail
 mail.com, a web portal and web-based email service provider
 Mail.Ru, a Russian email and online services provider

Other uses
 Chain mail, personal armour
Mail (film), a 2021 Indian Telugu-language film
 Mail (manga), a Japanese comic
 Mail, Shetland, a hamlet in the Shetland Islands, UK
 Ministry of Agriculture, Irrigation and Livestock (MAIL), Afghanistan
 Greg Mail (born 1978), an Australian cricketer
 Mailing, Fuchuan County, China

See also

 
 Post box